Mike Marciano is a two-time Grammy Award-winning audio engineer, and 
six time Grammy nominated, multi-platinum and gold record award, GMA and Junos award recipient. He started his career in 1980, working exclusively at Systems Two Recording Studio in Brooklyn, New York. Early in his career, he worked with many well-known rock and heavy metal groups, including Type O Negative, Carnivore, Agnostic Front, Life of Agony. Many of his hardcore and metal credits are noted in Encyclopaedia Metallum. His work with Type O Negative was used in multiple movie soundtracks and other media. Since the early 90s, he has worked with some of the top musicians in the jazz field, including jazz greats like Wynton Marsalis (and his Grammy-nominated “Joe Cool’s Blues”), Clark Terry, Elvin Jones, and Steve Coleman. His work with Don Braden was used as the theme song for Cosby.

Accolades
In 2011, he received his first Grammy Award for Best Jazz Vocal Album "The Mosaic Project" by Terri Lynne Carrington. Then, in 2013 he received his second Grammy Award for Best Jazz Instrumental Album, Money Jungle: Provocative in Blue, by Terri Lynne Carrington.

In 2016, Marciano recorded In for a Penny, In for a Pound by Henry Threadgill, which received a Pulitzer Prize for Music.

The same year his work on Impromptu by the Rodriguez Brothers was also nominated for a Grammy Award.

In 2017, his work on Madera Latino by Brian Lynch was nominated for a Grammy.

In 2018, Two additional projects that Marciano engineered were nominated for Grammy's,Tipico by 
Miguel Zenón  and Art of the Arrangement by Doug Beavers.

Also in 2019, Mike's work on Happened, Happening by Yuying Hsu  won him a Golden Melody Award for Best Instrumental Recording Album - Technical Category.

In 2019, his work on Elio Villafranca's Cinque was nominated for a Best Latin Jazz Album Grammy Award.

In 2020, his work on Carib by David Sánchez was nominated for a Grammy Award in the Best Latin Jazz album category.

In 2021, Mike received his Grammy Win certificate for his mastering work on "Puertos: Music from International Waters: by The Emilio Solla Tango Jazz Orchestra, Best Jazz Album 

Also in 2021, he received a Juno award for Andy Milne and Unison's Best Jazz Album Award for reMission.

Also in 2021, another project Mike recorded, mixed and mastered received a Grammy Award nomination for Best Latin Jazz Album for Dafnis Prieto Sextet "Transparency" 

In the meantime Marciano is credited for over 1,300 recordings.
 He continues his career as "Systems Two", recording, mixing, and mastering jazz albums.

Gold and Platinum RIAA Certified Awards
Mortal Kombat Soundtrack (Cert. Platinum 1996)
Howard Stern - Private Parts (Cert. Platinum 1997)
Bloody Kisses (Cert. Gold 1995, Cert. Platinum 2000)
October Rust (Cert. Gold 2000)
Nativity in Black - A Tribute to Black Sabbath (Cert. Gold 2000)
After Dark DVD (Cert. Gold 2000)

Recorded Work Used on Movie Soundtracks
Bride of Chucky ("Love You to Death" by Type O Negative)
Freddy vs. Jason ("We Were Electrocute" by Type O Negative)
I Know What You Did Last Summer ("Summer Breeze" by Type O Negative)
Howard Stern - Private Parts ("Pictures of Matchstick Men" by Ozzy Osbourne with Type O Negative)
Mortal Kombat ("Blood and Fire" by Type O Negative)
The Blair Witch Project ("Haunted" by Type O Negative)
Nosferatu (Type O Negative Compilation)
Descent 2

Recorded Work Used in Other Media
Cosby (theme song)
Descent (video game)
Descent II - The Vertigo Series
Blood
Grand Theft Auto IV
The Darkness
NASCAR: Crank It Up

References

https://www.facebook.com/pages/Mike-Marciano-Systems-Two-Engineer/374546845949688?fref=ts

American audio engineers
Year of birth missing (living people)
Living people